Damien Cler (born 2 October 1983) is a French rugby seven forward who competed at the 2016 Olympics.

Cler is married to Julie and has a son Louis. He was included to the national team in 2015.

References

External links 

 
 
 
 

1983 births
Living people
Rugby sevens players at the 2016 Summer Olympics
Olympic rugby sevens players of France
France international rugby sevens players